Jean-François Allard (1785–1839), born in Saint Tropez, was a French soldier and adventurer.

Allard served in Napoleon's army, where he was twice injured. He was awarded the Légion d'honneur, and was promoted to the rank of Captain of the French 7th Hussar Regiment. 

After the Battle of Waterloo Allard drifted, going to Persia where he visited Abbas Mirza to propose his services. He was promised the rank of Colonel, but never actually received the troops corresponding to his function.

In 1820, Allard left for the Punjab, where in 1822 he entered the service of the Maharaja Ranjit Singh. He was commissioned to raise a corps of dragoons and lancers. On completion of this task, Allard was awarded the rank of general, and became the leader of the European officer corps in the Maharaja's service. While serving under Maharaja Ranjit Singh, he fell in love with Princess Bannu Pan Dei from the area that is now Himachal Pradesh. They married and eventually had seven children. In 1835, Allard returned to his hometown Saint-Tropez along with his wife and built "Pan Dei Palais" to commemorate their love. When he returned to India, to serve in Maharaja's army once again he left Pan Dei at Saint-Tropez, fearing that she might become Sati, if he died in India for any reason.

Another European who took service in the Punjab with Allard in 1822 was the Italian Jean-Baptiste Ventura. They were joined four years later by the Neapolitan Paolo Di Avitabile, and the Frenchman Claude August Court.  A Spaniard, by the name of Oms, also served with them for a period.

Allard was a charming and gentle man, very different from some of the other European mercenaries in the Punjab. He made the effort to learn Persian, and is said to have composed poetry in his new language.

He was an amateur numismatist, and contributed greatly to the early study of Ancient Indian coins.

In June 1834, Allard returned to France on leave, going back to the Punjab 18 months later. He continued to serve the Maharaja until his death in 1839.

Allard was awarded the Légion d'Honneur (French for Legion of Honour) by Napoleon Bonaparte, and the Kaukab-i-Iqbal-i-Punjab (Persian for Bright Star of Punjab) by Ranjit Singh.

See also
 France-Asia relations

Notes

External links
 The residence built by Allard in Saint Tropez in 1834: the Pan Dei Palais

1785 births
1839 deaths
People from Saint-Tropez
French mercenaries
Mercenaries in India
French expatriates in Iran
French expatriates in India
19th-century French people
French military personnel of the Napoleonic Wars